The 1938 Oklahoma A&M Cowboys football team represented Oklahoma A&M College in the 1938 college football season. This was the 38th year of football at A&M and the third under Ted Cox. The Cowboys played their home games at Lewis Field in Stillwater, Oklahoma. They finished the season 2–8, 0–4 in the Missouri Valley Conference.

Schedule

NFL Draft

The following Cowboy was drafted into the National Football League following the season.

References

Oklahoma AandM
Oklahoma State Cowboys football seasons
Oklahoma AandM